This is a list of legislatures by country. A "legislature" is the generic name for the national parliaments and congresses that act as a plenary general assembly of representatives and that have the power to legislate. All entities included in the list of sovereign states are included in this list.

Names of legislatures
The legislatures are listed with their names in English and the name in the (most-used) native language of the country (or the official name in the second-most used native language in cases where English is the majority "native" language)

List of legislatures

Supranational legislatures

Legislatures of sovereign states (Member and observer states of the United Nations)

Legislatures of autonomous regions, dependencies and other territories

Legislatures of non-UN states (including unrecognized and disputed territories)

See also
Elections by country (legislatures elections)
List of national governments
List of current heads of state and government
List of supreme courts by country
List of United States state legislatures
Legislative assemblies of Canadian provinces and territories
Parliaments of the Australian states and territories
National parliaments of the European Union
List of legislatures by number of members
List of legislative buildings
List of legislatures by female members
List of current presidents of legislatures

Notes

References

Legislatures-related lists
Legislatures